Notorious Woman is a 1974 BBC television serial based on the life of the French author George Sand. It starred Rosemary Harris in the title role. The seven episodes were written by Harry W. Junkin and directed by Waris Hussein.

In the United States, the series was broadcast in 1975–1976 as part of the fifth season of Masterpiece Theatre on PBS.

Principal cast
Rosemary Harris – George Sand
Lewis Fiander – Casimir Dudevant
George Chakiris – Frédéric Chopin
Alan Howard – Prosper Mérimée
Jeremy Irons – Franz Liszt
Peter Woodthorpe – Honoré de Balzac
Shane Briant – Alfred de Musset
Sinéad Cusack – Marie Dorval
Leon Vitali – Jules Sandeau
Jonathan Newth – Hippolyte Chatiron
Joyce Redman – Sophie Dupin
Cathleen Nesbitt – Madame Dupin
Georgina Hale – Solange Dudevant

Awards and nominations
1976 Emmy Award: Outstanding Lead Actress in a Limited Series, Rosemary Harris
1976 Golden Globe Nomination:  Best TV Actress in a Drama, Rosemary Harris

References

Sources
The New York Times. "TV: Notorious Woman",  20 November 1975
 The New York Times. "The ' 75 Season – A Few Nuggets Amid the Dross", 28 December 1975
Schor, Naomi. George Sand and Idealism. Gender and culture. New York: Columbia University Press, 1993.

External links

1970s British television miniseries
BBC television dramas
Period television series
Films directed by Waris Hussein
1974 British television series debuts
1974 British television series endings
1970s British drama television series